Port O' Call: Tarlkin's Landing is a 1981 science-fiction role-playing game supplement published by Judges Guild.

Contents
Port O' Call: Tarlkin's Landing is the first in Judges Guild's series of universal science-fiction role-playing aids.

Reception
William A. Barton reviewed Port O' Call: Tarlkin's Landing in The Space Gamer No. 49. Barton commented that "Tarlkin's Landing is, unfortunately, one of those 'universal' supplements that doesn't quite fit any system.  Still, if the conversion problems, the price, and other liabilities don't bother you, you probably will find Tarlkin's Port O' Call of some use."

Review
Different Worlds #20 (March, 1982)

References

Judges Guild publications
Role-playing game supplements introduced in 1981
Science fiction role-playing game supplements